Mikko Kukkonen (born 19 January 1988) is a Finnish former professional ice hockey defenceman.

Kukkonen played from 2006 to 2013 with KalPa.

Career statistics

References

External links

1988 births
Espoo Blues players
Finnish ice hockey defencemen
High1 players
Ilves players
Living people
KalPa players
People from Siilinjärvi
Sportspeople from North Savo